Micromyrtus trudgenii is a plant species of the family Myrtaceae endemic to Western Australia.

It is found on hills and ridges in a small area the Wheatbelt region of Western Australia between Perenjori and Yalgoo where it grows in loamy-clay soils over ironstone or dolerite.

Etymology
The species epithet, trudgenii, honours Malcolm Eric Trudgen.

References

trudgenii
Endemic flora of Western Australia
Myrtales of Australia
Rosids of Western Australia
Vulnerable flora of Australia
Plants described in 2007
Taxa named by Barbara Lynette Rye